Kharta is a region in Tibet lying to the east of Mount Everest and centred on the Kharta valley and Kama valley. The  Kharta valley starts at the col at Lhakpa La at the head of the Kharta Glacier from which the Kharta Chu river flows east to join the Phung Chu just beyond Khata village. Nearby to the south, the Kama valley starts at the Kangshung Glacier at the foot of Everest's Kangshung Face, and the Kama Chu flows southeast to the Phung Chu. The 1921 British Mount Everest reconnaissance expedition discovered Kharta when reconnoitring ways to climb Mount Everest and managed to reach the North Col via the Lhakpa La. Since that time Kharta has not been used as a way to approach the summit of Everest but the two valleys have become a popular area for trekking.

Geography

The  mountain Khartaphu is on the north of the col with Lakpa Ri and Kartse to the south. A second glacier descends from Kharta Changri to the north, converging into the main glacier. Beyond and below the Lhakpa La to the west is the East Rongbuk Glacier, the traditional route for ascending Everest from the north. The Phung Chu (called the Arun river in Nepal) descends a deep gorge as it cuts through Himalaya to join the Kosi River above Chatra Gorge.

The Kama valley lies to the south, at its head being the Kangshung Glacier at the foot of the Kangshung Face of Everest. Kama Chu descends the valley southeast and somewhat parallel with Kharta Chu. Several passes cross north-south between the two valleys, the main ones being Karpo La, Langma La and Shao La.

Kharta and Kama lie in the Mahalangur Himal region of Himalaya in Tingri in Xigazê prefecture of the Tibet Autonomous Region of China. The region is in what was the traditional Tibetan province of Ü-Tsang.

1921 British Mount Everest reconnaissance expedition

The expedition was initially based at Tingri to the north of Everest from where the northern and western approaches were explored. While the surveyors and climbers carried out this work, the leader of the expedition, Charles Howard-Bury headed back east to find a suitable base for exploration from the east of the mountain. Knowing by this time that the North Col was a likely good route, Howard-Bury found the glacial Kharta Chu which he guessed might originate from the North Col. He returned to Tingri and then the whole expedition moved to Kharta. From there various parties explored the Kharta and Kama valleys (see maps) eventually discovering that the Kama Chu came from the unscalable Kangshung Face. It turned out that the Kharta Chu came not from the North Col but from the Lhakpa La. Reaching this col they found that the only way from there to the North Col was to descend some 1200 feet to the upper East Rongbuk Glacier and climb back up to the North Col. This climb was achieved by George Mallory, Guy Bullock and Oliver Wheeler on 24 September 1921 but they could get no further and had an arduous return.

They found that, compared with the cold barrenness of the Rongbuk valley north of Everest, the Kharta and, even more noticeably, the Kama valleys were warm and verdant. Rhododendron, and scrub birch and juniper cover the valley slopes and willow borders the lower streams. On a practical level they were well afforested with plenty of wood for fuel – at Rongbuk the only fuel had been yak dung.

Possible childhood home of Tenzing Norgay

In his autobiography, Nepali Sherpa mountaineer Tenzing Norgay, one of the first two people to climb Everest, has said he was born in the Nepalese village of Thame near Namche Bazaar. However, according to some commentators starting with Ed Webster and including Tenzing's grandson, he was actually born in Tibet at Tse Chu in the Kama valley near Makalu, his mother having been visiting the monastery of Namdag Lhe Phodang at Ghang La also in the Kama valley. As a young child he lived at Moyun, in the Kharta valley, where his father herded yaks. The herd succumbed to disease and as a child Tenzing went to Nepal to work for a Sherpa family in Khumbu. .

Trekking

The Kharta and Kama valleys are within the Qomolangma National Nature Preserve
and provide a quieter area for trekking than Everest Base Camp in the Rongbuk valley. The Kama valley and the Kangshung Face tend to be the focus of the treks but the approach is from the Kharta valley which is returned to after a round tour. Many organisations offer trekking holidays and these are often part bookings on a larger organised expedition. A track passable by four-wheeled drives leaves the Friendship Highway at Tingri from where tickets are available for the guarded Nature Preserve. The track leads to the village of Kharta. The trek may either be by backpacking or after hiring yaks at the village A route typically taken (see map) goes up the valley via Yuluk and Yulba and then heads south over Shao La and descends to Kama Chu. The trail ascends the Kama valley with Chomolonzo and Makalu to the south and eventually reaching the Kangshung Glacier to see the Kangshung Face – the glacier has retreated considerably since the 1921 expedition. The return is made over Langma La back  to Kharta Chu and then, passing through Lhundrubling, heads eastwards to the start. A local guide is essential (required by the authorities except for organised tours) and the journey on foot or yak takes about 10 days.

Notes

References

Citations

Sources

Valleys of Tibet
Tourist attractions in Tibet
Mount Everest